The Joint Planning Document, issued by the Joint Staff, generates specific programming recommendations for the Defense Planning Guidance and provides the first concrete basis for the National Military Strategy.

See also
 Joint Requirements Oversight Council
 National Security Strategy of the United States
 National Military Strategy (United States)

External links
Defense Acquisition University 

United States defense procurement
United States defense policymaking